The 2013–14 Sydney Blue Sox season was the team's fourth season. The Blue Sox competed in the Australian Baseball League (ABL) against five other teams, playing its home games at Blacktown International Sportspark Sydney.

Offseason

Regular season

Standings

Record vs opponents

Game log 

|-bgcolor=#ffbbbb
| 1
| 1 November
| @ 
| 0-10
| M. Ekstrom
| C. Anderson
| -
| 0-1
| 
|-bgcolor=#bbffbb 
| 2
| 2 November
| @  (DH 1)
| 5-4
| L. Wilkins
| L. Baron
| D. Koo
| 1-1
| 
|-bgcolor=#bbffbb
| 3
| 2 November
| @  (DH 2)
| 7-2
| C. Whalen
| K. Grendell
| -
| 2-1
| 
|-bgcolor=#bbffbb
| 4
| 3 November
| @ 
| 11-0
| A. Sookee
| D. Schmidt
| -
| 3-1
| 
|-bgcolor=#bbffbb 
| 5
| 8 November
| 
| 5-2
| C. Anderson
| B. Grening
| D. Koo
| -
| 
|-bgcolor=#ffbbbb
| 6
| 9 November
| 
| 1-6
| E. Cole
| A. Sookee
| -
| 4-2
| 
|-bgcolor=#ffbbbb
| 7
| 10 November
| 
| 2-4
| N. Pugliese
| W. Lundgren
| S. Toler
| 4-3
| 
|-bgcolor=#bbffbb
| 8
| 15 November
| @ 
| 10-8
| L. Wilkins
| T. Brechbuehler
| D. Koo
| 5-3
| 
|-bgcolor=#bbffbb
| 9
| 16 November
| @ 
| 7-6
| J. Guyer
| A. Thompson
| D. Koo
| 6-3
| 
|-bgcolor=#bbffbb
| 10
| 17 November
| @ 
| 7-2
| C. Whalen
| C. Barnes
| -
| 7-3
| 
|-bgcolor=#ffbbbb
| 11
| 29 November
| 
| 0-1
| J. Frawley
| C. Anderson
| B. Wise
| 7-4
| 
|-bgcolor=#ffbbbb
| 12
| 30 November
|  (DH 1)
| 0-6
| M. Ekstrom
| J. Guyer
| -
| 7-5
| 
|-bgcolor=#ffbbbb
| 13
| 30 November
|  (DH 2)
| 3-4
| A. Claggett
| C. Whalen
| -
| 7-6
| 
|-

|-bgcolor=#ffbbbb 
| 14
| 1 December
|  
| 1-3
| D. Schmidt
| A. Sookee
| S. Mitchinson
| 7-7
| 
|-bgcolor=#ffbbbb
| 15
| 5 December
| @  
| 5-13
| B. Grening
| C. Anderson
| -
| 7-8
| 
|-bgcolor=#bbffbb 
| 16
| 6 December
| @ 
| 11-4
| C. Whalen
| E. Cole
| -
| 8-8
| 
|-bgcolor=#bbffbb 
| 17
| 7 December
| @ 
| 8-1
| A. Sookee
| J. Lyman
| L. Wilkins
| 9-8
| 
|-bgcolor=#ffbbbb 
| 18
| 8 December
| @ 
| 7-8
| E. Massingham
| M. Rae
| S. Toler
| 9-9
| 
|-bgcolor=#bbffbb 
| 19
| 13 December
| 
| 5-1
| C. Anderson
| D. Holman
| -
| 10-9
| 
|-bgcolor=#ffbbbb 
| 20
| 14 December
| 
| 3-5
| R. Olson
| C. Whalen
| M. Williams
| 10-10
| 
|-bgcolor=#ffbbbb 
| 21
| 15 December
| 
| 1-3
| B. Holovach
| A. Sookee
| M. Williams
| 10-11
| 
|-bgcolor=#bbffbb 
| 22
| 16 December
| 
| 2-1
| V. Harris
| K. Brueggemann
| D. Koo
| 11-11
| 
|-bgcolor=#ffbbbb 
| 23
| 20 December
| @ 
| 2-6
| J. Burns
| C. Anderson
| -
| 11-12
| 
|-bgcolor=#bbffbb
| 24
| 21 December 
| @  (DH 1)
| 3-2
| C. Whalen
| J. Hussey
| D. Koo
| 12-12
| 
|-bgcolor=#ffbbbb 
| 25
| 21 December
| @  (DH 2)
| 0-4
| L. Thorpe
| A. Sookee
| -
| 12-13
| 
|-bgcolor=#ffbbbb 
| 26
| 22 December
| @ 
| 3-4
| F. Flores
| M. Rae
| B. Zawacki
| 12-14
| 
|-bgcolor=#bbffbb 
| 27
| 27 December
| 
| 3-2
| C. Anderson
| M. Jannis
| D. Koo
| 13-14
| 
|-bgcolor=#ffbbbb 
| 28
| 28 December
| 
| 2-9
| A. Aizenstadt
| C. Whalen
| -
| 13-15
| 
|-bgcolor=#bbffbb 
| 29
| 29 December
| 
| 1-0
| A. Sookee
| R. Searle
| - 
| 14-15
| 
|-bgcolor=#ffbbbb 
| 30
| 30 December
| 
| 3-4
| T. Crawford
| D. Koo
| -
| 14-16
| 
|-

|-bgcolor=#bbffbb 
| 31
| 2 January
| @ 
| 5-4
| C. Anderson
| M. Jannis
| D. Koo
| 15-16
| 
|-bgcolor=#ffbbbb 
| 32
| 3 January
| @ 
| 4-5
| T. Crawford
| T. Van Steensel
| -
| 15-17
| 
|-bgcolor=#bbffbb 
| 33
| 4 January
| @ 
| 7-5
| A. Sookee
| R. Searle
| D. Koo
| 16-17
| 
|-bgcolor=#ffbbbb 
| 34
| 5 January
| @ 
| 3-7
| R. Niit
| J. Guyer
| -
| 16-18
| 
|-bgcolor=#bbffbb 
| 35
| 9 January
| 
| 4-3
| L. Wilkins
| S. Toler
| -
| 17-18
| 
|-bgcolor=#ffbbbb 
| 36
| 10 January
| 
| 0-10
| E. Cole
| A. Sookee
| -
| 17-19
| 
|-bgcolor=#bbffbb 
| 37
| 11 January
| 
| 9-6
| J. Lyons
| S. Chambers
| -
| 18-19
| 
|-bgcolor=#bbffbb 
| 38
| 12 January
| 
| 3-2
| D. Koo
| S. Toler
| -
| 19-19
| 
|-bgcolor=#bbffbb 
| 39
| 16 January
| @ 
| 8-1
| C. Anderson
| K. Brueggemann
| -
| 20-19
| 
|-bgcolor=#ffbbbb 
| 40
| 17 January
| @ 
| 2-5
| R. Olson
| A. Sookee
| -
| 20-20
| 
|-bgcolor=#bbffbb
| 41
| 18 January
| @ 
| 4-0
| C. Whalen
| D. Fidge
| -
| 21-20
| 
|-bgcolor=#ffbbbb 
| 42
| 19 January
| @ 
| 2-7
| M. Williams
| V. Harris
| -
| 21-21
| 
|-bgcolor=#bbffbb
| 43
| 23 January
| 
| 4-3
| W. Lundgren
| T. Holder
| D. Koo
| 22-21
| 
|-bgcolor=#ffbbbb
| 44
| 24 January
| 
| 3-6
| J. Hussey
| A. Sookee
| -
| 22-22
| 
|-bgcolor=#bbffbb 
| 45
| 25 January
| 
| 4-2
| C. Whalen
| J. Erasmus
| D. Koo
| 23-22
| 
|-bgcolor=#ffbbbb 
| 46
| 26 January
| 
| 0-2
| F. Flores
| V. Harris
| B. Zawacki
| 23-23
| 
|-

Postseason 

Three teams in the ABL qualified for a two-round postseason. The highest placed team at the end of the 2013-14 regular season, the Perth Heat gained entry to and hosted the Championship Series. The second and third place teams at the end of the 2013-14 regular season, the Sydney Blue Sox and the Canberra Cavalry, respectively, played a preliminary final series to determine the Perth Heat's opponent in the Championship Series. The Blue Sox fell to the Cavalry 1 game to 2, thus ending the Blue Sox's postseason run and advancing the Cavalry to the Championship Series.

|-bgcolor=#bbffbb
| 1
| 31 January
| 
| 18-11
| A. Sookee
| B. Grening
| -
| 1-0
|  
|-bgcolor=#ffbbbb 
| 2
| 1 February
| 
| 3-4
| E. Cole
| L. Baron
| S. Toler
| 1-1
|  
|-bgcolor=#ffbbbb
| 3
| 2 February
| 
| 1-9
| S. Chambers
| V. Harris
| C. Everts
| 1-2
|  
|-

Roster

References 

Sydney Blue Sox
Sydney Blue Sox